Mozhayka (Mujykha) is a rural locality (a settlement) in Yeravninsky District, Republic of Buryatia, Russia. The population was 1,117 as of 2010. There are 43 streets.

Geography 
Mozhayka is located 55 km southwest of Sosnovo-Ozerskoye (the district's administrative centre) by road. Egita is the nearest rural locality.

References 

Rural localities in Yeravninsky District